The Egyptian Nation Alliance (also translated as Egyptian National Alliance, Egyptian Patriotism Alliance, Alliance for the Egyptian Nation, Coalition of the Egyptian Nation, or Egyptian National Coalition) was a coalition of 12 parties.

Known members of the coalition included the Ghad El-Thawra Party, the Democratic Front Party, the New Wafd Party, and 9 other parties. Purported members included the Conference Party, the Egyptian Popular Current, the Socialist Popular Alliance Party, the Egyptian Social Democratic Party, the Revolutionary Democratic Coalition and the Free Egyptians Party.

However, it is not entirely clear which parties joined the coalition. An article in Al Akhbar states that some parties that are mentioned as members have not yet made a final decision on whether to join the coalition.

Formerly affiliated parties 
 Conference Party
 New Wafd Party
 Free Egyptians Party
 Egyptian Social Democratic Party
 Socialist Party of Egypt
 Egyptian Communist Party
 Socialist Popular Alliance Party
 Socialist Revolutionary Movement (January)
 Tagammu Party
 Workers Democratic Party
 Workers and Peasants Party
 Egyptian Popular Current
 Reform and Development Party
 Egyptian Renaissance Party
 Victory Party  
 Egyptian Liberation Party
 Dignity Party

References 

Defunct political party alliances in Egypt
Organizations with year of establishment missing